Zowab (also Romanized as Zowāb) is a village in Seydun-e Shomali Rural District, Seydun District, Bagh-e Malek County, Khuzestan Province, Iran. At the 2006 census, its population was 18, in 4 families.

References 

Populated places in Bagh-e Malek County